Franz Harnoncourt, or Harnoncourt-Unverzagt (born 2 August 1937) is an Austrian jurist, CEO of the Kastner & Öhler department store in Graz, and president and member of the advisory board of the Grazer Wechselseitige Versicherung.

Life and career 
He is a brother of the physician Karl Harnoncourt, the late conductor Nikolaus Harnoncourt and the late theologian Philipp Harnoncourt.

He studied law, promoted to the doctorate. He began at the Kastner & Öhler, including jobs such as sales person and storage worker, and served as CEO for decades. From 1982 to 2012, he was also president and member of the supervisory board of the Grazer Wechselseitige Versicherung insurance company. He has been honorary president since.

Harnoncourt is a knight of the Order of Malta, serving as Rezeptor of Austria. He represents Luxembourg as honorary consul. Harnoncourt is also president of the Graz Musikverein, supporting concerts of classical music.

Franz Harnoncourt and Marion née Fogarassy (born 1941), the daughter of Viktor Fogarassy and Dollie Kastner, married in 1965. The couple has five daughters and a son.

They supported the project initiated by his brother Philipp to restore the Heiligen-Geist-Kapelle, Bruck in Bruck, and he and his wife attended the opening celebration on 7 June 2020.

Awards 
 1999: Großes Goldenes Ehrenzeichen für Verdienste um die Republik Österreich (Grand Decoration of Honour in Gold for Services to the Republic of Austria)
 2007: 
 2012: Großes Goldenes Ehrenzeichen mit dem Stern für Verdienste um die Republik Österreich (Grand Decoration of Honour in Gold with Star)
 2012: Bürger der Stadt Graz

References

External links 
 Hein Bruns: Descendants of Archduke Johann of Austria, heinbruins.nl 
 Karlpeter Elis: Graz und die Steiermark / Ihre Geschichte (in German) graz.elis-management.com

Austrian chief executives
Honorary consuls
Harnoncourt, Franz
Austrian jurists
1937 births
Living people
Recipients of the Grand Decoration for Services to the Republic of Austria
Harnoncourt family